A flight-to-liquidity is a financial market phenomenon occurring when investors sell what they perceive to be less liquid or higher risk investments, and purchase more liquid investments instead, such as US Treasuries. Usually, flight-to-liquidity quickly results in panic leading to a crisis.

For example, after the Russian government defaulted on its government bonds (GKOs) in 1998 many investors sold European and Japanese government bonds and purchased on-the-run US Treasuries instead. 
(The most recently issued treasuries, known as “on-the-run”, have larger trading volumes, that is more liquidity, than treasury issues that have been superseded, known as “off-the run”.)
This widened the spread between off-the-run and on-the-run US Treasuries, which ultimately led to the 1998 collapse of the Long-Term Capital Management hedge fund.

See also
 Financial contagion
 Financial crisis
 Flight-to-quality
 Stock market crash

References

External links
 The Flight-to-Liquidity Premium in U.S. Treasury Bond Prices
 Flight to Liquidity Due to Heterogeneity in Investment Horizon

Financial problems
Financial markets